Pinball Museum may refer to:

United States 
Asheville Pinball Museum, a museum located in Asheville, North Carolina
Museum of Pinball, a museum in Banning, California 
Pacific Pinball Museum, a museum in Alameda, California
Pinball Perfection, a museum, restoration and event center in West View, Pennsylvania
Roanoke Pinball Museum, a museum located in Roanoke, Virginia
Silverball Museum (Delray Beach), Florida
Silverball Museum, a museum located in Asbury Park, New Jersey
Seattle Pinball Museum, a museum located in Seattle, Washington

Other places 
Australian Pinball Museum, a museum in Nhill, Victoria, Australia
Dutch Pinball Museum, a museum in Rotterdam, the Netherlands
Kraków Pinball Museum, a museum in Kraków, Poland

See also
Musée Mécanique, an interactive museum consisting of 20th-century penny arcade games including pinball machines
Pinball Hall of Fame (disambiguation)